Adductomics is the study of DNA adducts in the context of an entire genome.  DNA adducts are compounds that bind to DNA, causing damage and mutations.  These mutations can result in cancer and birth defects in multicellular organisms.  The science of adductomics seeks to identify all DNA adducts and the target sequence of each adduct.

The term "adductome" first appeared in a journal article in 2005.  Although originally the term related to adducts of DNA, the adductomic approach has now been adopted by protein chemists in their attempts to identify protein adducts.

References

DNA
Oncology